José Anastácio da Cunha (1744 – January 1, 1787) was a Portuguese mathematician. He is best known for his work on the theory of equations, algebraic analysis, plain and spherical trigonometry, analytical geometry, and differential calculus.

References

External links
 

1744 births
1787 deaths
18th-century Portuguese mathematicians
People from Lisbon